Strensall is a village in the Strensall with Towthorpe civil parish in the unitary authority of the City of York in North Yorkshire, England, on the River Foss north of York and north-east of Haxby. From the 2011 Census, the civil parish of Strensall with Towthorpe and had a population of 6,047. It covers an area of 2,908 acres.

The village was historically part of the North Riding of Yorkshire until 1974. It was then a part of the district of Ryedale in North Yorkshire from 1974 until 1996. Since 1996 it has been part of the City of York unitary authority.

The nearby Strensall Common is a Special Area of Conservation, an example of lowland heathland habitat covering over 5 km2. The southern part is designated as a Site of Special Scientific Interest. Strensall also has an army firing range and training area both of which belong to the Ministry of Defence.

History

Strensall is referred to in the Domesday Book of 1086 as Streonaeshalch, after Streona, a personal name, and halch, a corner of land. The name has altered through the centuries from Strenshale in the 11th century, to Stranessale in the 14th century and to Strencile or Strencham alias Trencham in the 17th century.

It has belonged to the Archbishops of York since before 1214, apart from a short period in 1547 when it was briefly held by the Duke of Somerset and Lord Wharton. During the reign of Edward the Confessor the manor and land belonged to a couple of Saxon lords known as Sasford and Turchil.

Strensall is also the possible site of many historical events supposed to have occurred in Whitby, most significantly the  Synod of Whitby of 664. This is due to a complication in 9th-century documents, which describe Streonaeshalch as being Whitby (the name Whitby is Viking as are all place names ending with the suffix "by", e.g. Selby, Grimsby, Wetherby etc. – "by" means "town" in Scandinavian languages, from the verb "bo", meaning "to reside").

The Hall with its moat and large grounds were to the north of the church. On the same site probably stood the manor-house of 1649 and 1757 which also had a moat.

To the south of the village lies Strensall Camp, formed by the War Office in 1884 for training troops and now known as Queen Elizabeth Barracks.

Demography

The 1881 census records the population as being 446. According to the 2001 census the Strensall with Towthorpe parish had a population of 3,815.

Governance

Strensall was in the Ryedale parliamentary constituency until the 2010 general election when it was transferred to the newly created constituency of York Outer.

Strensall forms its own ward in the City of York Council, together with the villages of Stockton-on-the-Forest and Earswick. As of May 2019, it is represented by Tony Fisher of the Liberal Democrats and Paul Doughty of the Conservative Party.

The village is part of the Strensall with Towthorpe Parish Council. There are 14 councillors in total.

Geography

The soil is sand and foxmole laid over a subsoil of white and grey sandstone. The land lies for the most part about 50 ft above sea level. The River Foss flows from the north-east of the village in a south and south-westerly direction towards Towthorpe. It is crossed by three bridges. About a quarter of a mile east of the village is the disused Strensall station on the York and Scarborough branch of the North Eastern railway.

Strensall Common

Strensall Common lies to the east of the village and forms part of the surrounding lowland heath. There are a number of different habitats, such as wet heath, dry heath and birch/oak woodland with areas of standing water. There are over 150 plant species including, marsh cinquefoil, marsh gentian, round-leaved sundew and petty whin.

There are over 60 species of bird including curlew, whinchat, and both green and great spotted woodpecker. Amongst the numerous insects to be found are green and purple hairstreaks, the dark-bordered beauty, bog bush cricket and glowworm. Other wildlife seen here include red fox, European hare and harvest mouse. Hebridean sheep and Highland cattle graze during summer to keep down vegetation.

The site is maintained by the Yorkshire Wildlife Trust.

Economy

In the 19th century employment was found in a tannery in the village. There were also the Strensall Pottery and Britannia Pottery near the village. Though there is some employment at the local Barracks, the village is mostly a dormitory for commuters to nearby York.

Transport

First York operate a service through the village as part of the York City Centre to Strensall route (Number 5 and 5a).

There are three level crossings within Strensall as it lies on the York to Scarborough line but there is no station any more. Strensall railway station was a minor railway station serving the village. It was opened on 5 July 1845 by the York & North Midland Railway and closed on 22 September 1930.

Community

Strensall has three local grocery shops plus a post office, three pubs, a bakery, a hairdressers, a fish & chip shop and Chinese takeaway. It also has a library and a medical centre. Its sports facilities include 2 playing fields, one with changing rooms; three floodlit tennis courts; two football pitches and one astro pitch and five small parks. There are 20 half plot allotments on New Lane run by the council and were established in 2008. There are also 14 plots run by the Parish Council on Northfield Lane.

Religious sites

A Wesleyan chapel existing in Strensall from 1823 was succeeded by a new building in 1895. Between 1879 and 1889 a Primitive Methodist chapel was built in the village.

The Parish Church of Strensall is St Mary the Virgin. The current building was consecrated by the Archbishop of York in 1866 after the old building, originally dedicated to St James, was destroyed about 1798 or 1800. There are also the Methodist Chapel and St Wilfred's Garrison Church.

Education

Strensall falls within the secondary education catchment areas for Huntington School in the northern outskirts of York. Robert Wilkinson is the local primary school and was founded in 1718 from money left by a local farmer of that name. It moved to its present location on West End in 1972.

Sports

Strensall is the home of the York Golf Club. Strensall Football Club 1XI play in Division Two of the York and District Football League.

Gallery

References

Villages in the City of York